Vincent Asaro (born 1935) is an American mobster and former captain in the Bonanno crime family.

Mob career
Vincent Asaro was born in 1935 in Ozone Park, Queens. In 1953, his father Joseph Asaro and mother Victoria separated. His father was the brother-in-law to Michael Zaffarano. Asaro followed his father Joseph and uncle Michael Zaffarano into the Mafia. 

In August 1977, Asaro was inducted into the Bonanno crime family, alongside Peter Monteleone and Gerard "Jerry" Chilli. In 1979, after the murder of Bonanno boss Carmine Galante, Asaro became a capo of a Queens crew in the Bonanno family. In February 1980, his uncle Michael Zaffarano died.

According to Lucchese crime family associate turned informant Henry Hill, Asaro was a caporegime in the Bonanno crime family, who oversaw the family's interests in JFK airport. 

Asaro would help his son Jerome Asaro become a member of the Bonanno family and taking over his crew. However, Asaro and son had a falling out in later years and did not speak with each other.

Lufthansa heist accusations
On January 23, 2014, Asaro was arrested by the FBI and indicted on federal racketeering charges stemming from the 1978 Lufthansa heist. The charges also included the theft of $1.25 million of gold salts, involvement in the pornography industry, and for the ordering of the murder of a cousin who testified in court. Arrested along with Asaro were his son Jerome, acting boss Thomas DiFiore, acting capo Giacomo Bonventre, and soldier John Ragano.

Controversially, author Daniel Simone, Henry Hill's co-writer of their book, The Lufthansa Heist, published on August 1, 2015 by Lyons Press, claims that Henry Hill asserted to him that "Asaro had no involvement in the famous robbery." In fact, Asaro does not appear nor is mentioned in Simone's book. Furthermore, in the Author's Notes and Sources page of The Lufthansa Heist, Simone lists numerous law enforcement agents who collaborated with him in the development of the book and, he attests, none of these subjects ever mentioned Asaro in connection with the Lufthansa robbery. More strangely, those investigators had not known about a Gaspar Valenti, the informant who testified against Asaro, his cousin.

In November 2015, Asaro was found not guilty of all charges related to the Lufthansa heist.

Paul Katz murder suspect

Asaro was also a suspect in the 1969 death of Paul Katz. Katz owned a warehouse that Asaro and James Burke used to store stolen goods. When law enforcement raided the warehouse, Asaro and Burke immediately suspected Katz of being a government informant. The two men allegedly killed Katz with a dog chain and buried his remains under a vacant house. When the NYPD reopened the Katz case, Asaro and Burke allegedly moved the remains to the house of Burke's daughter and reburied them there. In 2013, a police search uncovered the remains.

Asaro was also arrested and tried for the murder of Paul Katz, but was acquitted of all charges on November 12, 2015.

Arson order
In March 2017, Asaro was indicted and charged in an arson case. In June 2017, Asaro pleaded guilty in a case of ordering car arson against a motorist who had cut him off in Howard Beach, Queens in April 2012. Prosecutors allege that Asaro enlisted a Bonanno crime family associate to execute the crime however the associate engaged the grandson of former Gambino crime family boss John Gotti, John J. Gotti (who also pleaded guilty in the case) to instead perform the order. The next day after the incident, Asaro apparently contacted a Gambino crime family associate who had access to a local police department database. The database linked the car plate to the home address of the driver. Prosecutors also alleged that Gotti was the getaway driver during a $6,000 bank robbery in 2012; he and another man pleaded guilty. Asaro was incarcerated at the Metropolitan Detention Center, Brooklyn while awaiting sentencing. He faced the possibility of up to 20 years in prison meanwhile prosecutors were seeking 15 years in prison. The Brooklyn prosecutors said that although Asaro has "participated in racketeering, murder, robbery, extortion, loansharking, gambling and other illegal conduct, he has served less than eight years in jail." In late December 2017, Asaro was sentenced to eight years in prison. Initially scheduled to be released from the United States Medical Center for Federal Prisoners in 2022, he was granted a compassionate release on April 14, 2020, and released six days later, due to his age and health vulnerability (he had a stroke the year prior) because of the risk of COVID-19 amid the COVID-19 pandemic in the United States.

References

Further reading
 DeStefano, Anthony M., The Big Heist, Pinnacle Books, 2017.

 

1935 births
Living people
American gangsters of Italian descent
Bonanno crime family
People from Ozone Park, Queens
Criminals from Queens, New York
Gangsters from New York City